Vijay Menon is an American author of Indian descent. In 2018, he wrote a A Brown Man in Russia: Lessons Learned on the Trans-Siberian, a biographical novel about traveling through Russia as a person of color.

Early life and education
Vijay Menon is a second generation Indian American from California. He attended an undergraduate educational program at Duke University, and in 2015, received a dual degree in Statistics and Economics at Trinity College of Arts and Sciences.

In December, 2013, while an undergraduate student at Duke University, Menon took a Trans-Siberian rail trip from Moscow to Mongolia and later wrote a biographical novel about his encounters with the local Russian people as a person of color. Altogether, Menon traveled in more than 50 countries and worked as a statistics specialist in Microsoft, Dropbox and Scribd.

A Brown Man in Russia

First published in May 2018 in London by Glagoslav Publications the novel consists of 26 chapters written in the first person. The narrative of each chapter is divided into a detailed description of the adventures taking place with three Duke students (two of them are people of color) and ends with a "lesson learned" on the basis of the events of the past day. While traveling from Moscow to Mongolia by the Trans-Siberian railway, the students are confronted with the cultural and linguistic peculiarities of the Russian people. Along the way, the travelers are generally welcomed with warm hospitality of the Russians. At the end of the journey, the students who were afraid to encounter xenophobia towards coloured people in Russia, change their perception of the country and experience a psychological phenomenon of "breaking stereotypes and biased misconceptions." The author concludes that cultural and political differences between people and countries cannot be an obstacle to peace and friendship.

Reviews

Although some literary critics noted "a lofty vocabulary and pompous writing", the book generally received positive reviews.

Yelena Furman, a professor at New York University and a literary critic from Jordan Russia Center wrote: " A Brown Man in Russia: Lessons Learned on the Trans-Siberian is more than a catalogue of travel (mis)adventures by an often underprepared but sincerely curious millennial. Menon is first generation Indian American, and the lessons he learns, imparted via a “Lesson” subsection in each chapter, are meditations on cultural identity, alienation, and belonging in both Russia and the U.S. The book's uniqueness stems from being written by a brown American traveller in Russia, a point of view not traditionally represented in travel or other types of literature, with Menon's ruminations on his cultural position forming the backbone of the travelogue." According to Loretta Marie Perera from The Moscow Times: “A Brown Man in Russia” is also a great chance for any reader to take an honest look at your own Russian experience – whatever ethnicity you are – and compare how you first behaved to how you are now." Jinyi Chu from Ohio State University noted: "... this book still has its significance in literary history. Travelogues are always about the clash of cultures and the perception of difference. Yet the twenty-first century, given the sweeping power of globalization, offers little respectable room for travel writing. Menon's book, in this sense, is an attempt at finding a space for travel writing in today's world. A Brown Man in Russia should interest scholars of the travelogue in the age of globalization or of contemporary American perceptions of Russia."

References

Living people
American male biographers
Duke University Trinity College of Arts and Sciences alumni
21st-century American biographers
21st-century American male writers
Year of birth missing (living people)